David Semenovich Nemirovsky (Russian: Дэвид Немировски; born August 1, 1976) is a Canadian former professional ice hockey forward.

Playing career
Nemirovsky was born in Toronto, Canada, and is of Russian descent. As a youth, he played in the 1990 Quebec International Pee-Wee Hockey Tournament with a minor ice hockey team from Wexford, Toronto.

Nemirovsky was drafted 84th overall by the National Hockey League's Florida Panthers in the 1994 NHL Entry Draft. Picked from the Ottawa 67's of the Ontario Hockey League, he went on to play parts of four seasons with Florida, playing 91 games for the Panthers and scoring 16 goals and 22 assists for 38 points, he also picked up 42 penalty minutes.

He played for Team Canada in the 1997 Maccabiah Games in Israel, winning a gold medal.

Nemirovsky then spent three seasons with the St. John's Maple Leafs in the American Hockey League before moving to Europe.  After short spells in Sweden and Russia, he spent two seasons in Finland before returning to Russia in 2003. In 2010, he played with CSKA Moscow. Nemirovsky came out of retirement and signed with CSKA Moscow of the KHL in 2013.

Executive and coaching career
Following his retirement from a 18-year playing career, Nemirovsky remained in Russia and moved into hockey management in accepting the role of Sports Director at the age of 38 for Admiral Vladivostok of the KHL from 2015 to 2018.

On May 7, 2018, Nemirovsky was announced as head coach for Torpedo Nizhny Novgorod of the KHL beginning from the 2018–19 season.

Career statistics

See also
List of select Jewish ice hockey players

References

External links

1976 births
Living people
Ak Bars Kazan players
Barys Nur-Sultan players
Canadian ice hockey right wingers
Canadian people of Russian-Jewish descent
Carolina Monarchs players
Competitors at the 1997 Maccabiah Games
HC CSKA Moscow players
HC Dinamo Minsk players
Florida Panthers draft picks
Florida Panthers players
HC Khimik Voskresensk players
HV71 players
Ilves players
Jewish Canadian sportspeople
Jewish ice hockey players
Jokerit players
Lokomotiv Yaroslavl players
Maccabiah Games competitors by sport
Maccabiah Games competitors for Canada
Ottawa 67's players
St. John's Maple Leafs players
SKA Saint Petersburg players
Ice hockey people from Toronto
Canadian expatriate ice hockey players in Belarus
Canadian expatriate ice hockey players in Russia
Canadian expatriate ice hockey players in Sweden